Josslyn may refer to:

Josslyn Hay, 22nd Earl of Erroll (1901-1941) British peer
Josslyn Francis Pennington, 5th Baron Muncaster (1834-1917) British politician 
Josslyn Island Site, archaeological site composed of a shell mound in Lee County, Florida 
"Josslyn", song by Olivia O'Brien 2020